The Onondaga Council governs the Onondaga Nation, a sovereign nation, one of six nations of the Iroquois people, that lives on a portion of its ancestral territory and maintains its own distinct laws, language, customs, and culture. The "nation" is not governed by a Council of Chiefs since the notion of federalism and proportional representation was strictly adhered to. After the dissolution of the League, interests lie only in external matters such as war, peace, and treaty-making to further the unanimity of the United States government. Since Tadodaho was appointed to the council fire and given weapons to protect the sacred fire within the house, the Grand Council could not interfere in the internal affairs of the tribe. Their role was limited to matters between themselves and other tribes; they had no say in matters that were traditionally the concern of the ability of the clan names.

The Onondaga Nation government does not pay income, sales, or excise taxes to New York State or to the federal government of the United States, nor does it receive any of the benefits paid for by these taxes.

Present day
The Onondaga Nation is an independent nation. A Confederacy of Haudenosaunee exists but without formal political function. The Grand Council of the Iroquois League is composed of 56 Hoyenah (chiefs) or Sachems. The chiefs are all considered to have an equal voice. The seats on the Council are distributed among the Six Nations as follows:

 14 Onondaga
 10 Cayuga
 9 Oneida
 9 Mohawk
 8 Seneca
 6 Tuscarora

The chiefs make decisions to protect their people, looking forward seven generations to the future in each decision. The Great Peacemaker leads the Council in effigy. He is the embodiment of supreme sacrifice since it is Ionhawatha who was held to the Mohawk fires. As the Tadodaho reigns to resolve Ionhawath's dead children, so will The Great Peacemaker be held to relevancy in light of universal suffrage.

The Onondaga Hoyane is divided into three separate benches, which make decisions by consensus. A decision made by the tree branches is said to be "Of One Mind". A person serves as Hoyane for life and the "Clan Mother" helps to identify leaders in the community to serve in this position.

See also
 Onondaga people
 Onondaga Reservation

References

Council
Native American organizations